The Morse House is a historic house located at 6 Pleasant Street in Taunton, Massachusetts.

Description and history 
It is a -story wood-frame structure, with a gable roof and clapboard siding. It is considered a fine example of Gothic Revival architecture in a cottage form, with vergeboard in the gables, and a bracketed porch. It was built in 1850. While it suffered an interior fire in 1980, it has retained much of its original wood details. The house has been converted to office space.

The house was listed on the National Register of Historic Places on July 5, 1984.

See also
National Register of Historic Places listings in Taunton, Massachusetts

References

National Register of Historic Places in Taunton, Massachusetts
Houses in Taunton, Massachusetts
Houses on the National Register of Historic Places in Bristol County, Massachusetts
Houses completed in 1850
Gothic Revival architecture in Massachusetts
Greek Revival houses in Massachusetts